Tale Spinnin' is the fifth studio album by Weather Report, recorded and released in 1975, featuring the addition of Leon "Ndugu" Chancler on the drums. Ndugu was recruited after Josef Zawinul heard him play with Carlos Santana. Weather Report was recording next door to Ndugu in the studio, and Chancler was asked to join them for a recording session. That session ended up lasting a week and produced Tale Spinnin'. After the record, Ndugu was asked to join the band as a permanent member, but declined in favor of continuing to work with Carlos Santana.

Some Canadian copies of the album list a track entitled "Krampus" on the back of the sleeve. However, this track does not appear on the actual record.

Release history
In addition to the usual 2-channel stereo version the album was also released by Columbia in 1975 in 4-channel quadraphonic sound on LP record and 8-track tape. The quad LP release was encoded in the SQ matrix system. The quad mixes were performed by Bruce Botnick.

The album was reissued in the UK on the Super Audio CD format in 2018 by Dutton Vocalion. This edition contains both the stereo and quad mixes.

Track listing

Personnel 

 Josef Zawinul - Rhodes piano, acoustic piano, melodica,  TONTO synthesizer, ARP 2600 synthesizer, organ, steel drums, oud, mzuthra,  West African talking drum, xylophone, cymbals, vocals
 Wayne Shorter - soprano and tenor saxophones
 Alphonso Johnson - electric bass
 Leon "Ndugu" Chancler - drums, tympani, marching cymbals
 Alyrio Lima - percussion

Technical

 Bruce Botnick - recording engineer, mixing
 Wayne Shorter - mixing
 Teresa Alfieri, John Berg - cover design

References

External links 

Weather Report Annotated Discography: Tale Spinnin'

Columbia Records albums
Weather Report albums
1975 albums